JLN may refer to one of the following:

 JLN Corporation, owned by Janet Lim-Napoles
 Joplin Regional Airport, Missouri, US, IATA code
 Jacqui Lambie Network, a minor Australian political party